Tarantinaea is a genus of sea snails, marine gastropod mollusks in the family Fasciolariidae, the spindle snails, the tulip snails and their allies.

Species
Species within the genus Tarantinaea include:
 † Tarantinaea fimbriata (Brocchi, 1814) 
 † Tarantinaea hoernesii (Seguenza, 1875) 
Tarantinaea lignaria (Linnaeus, 1758)

References

 Snyder M.A., Vermeij G.J. & Lyons W.G. (2012) The genera and biogeography of Fasciolariinae (Gastropoda, Neogastropoda, Fasciolariidae). Basteria 76(1-3): 31-70.

External links

Fasciolariidae